Qaleh Shira (also Romanized as Qal‘eh Shīrā) is a village in Balaband Rural District, in the Central District of Fariman County, Razavi Khorasan Province, Iran. At the 2006 census, its population was 34, in 8 families.

References 

Populated places in Fariman County